The Premier Lacrosse League All-Star Game is a field lacrosse game played between the best players on two teams representing the Premier Lacrosse League (PLL).

The inaugural game took place on Sunday, July 22, during the 2019 season, at Banc of California Stadium in Los Angeles, California.

There was also an All-Star Skills Competition that took place on Saturday, July 21 that was streamed on NBC Sports Gold.

Selection process
The PLL's inaugural All-Star Game featured the league's top 50 players selected by fans. Once the players were selected earlier this season, the PLL held an All-Star Draft on July 9 for team captains Trevor Baptiste of Atlas and Matt Rambo of the Whipsnakes, who both received the most fan votes, to select their 21 teammates.

Broadcast
The game was broadcast on NBCSN. Analysts Brendan Burke and Ryan Boyle were the play-by-play commentators, along with sideline reporter Chantel McCabe who conducted in-game interviews.

Players from each team were mic'd up for "under-the-helmet" interviews with analyst Ryan Boyle up in the booth. They were Paul Rabil, Justin Guterding and Jarrod Neumann of Team Baptiste, as well as, opposing team captain Matt Rambo.

Syracuse Lacrosse player, Lacrosse Hall of Fame and Pro Football Hall of Fame inductee Jim Brown joined the analysts in the booth during halftime and also gave an opening speech to all the players before the game. Also, Chantel McCabe interviewed legendary lacrosse player Gary Gait during the second quarter.

Rules
The standard PLL face-off rules were modified for the All-Star Game. (All quarters start with a face-off).
1st Quarter: Same as regular season with Lacrosse face-off.
2nd Quarter: Goalie begins play again after each goal scored.
3rd Quarter: "Hockey-style" face-off (like a puck-drop) is in effect.
4th Quarter/Overtime: Same rules as regular season.

Teams
Team Rambo (captain Matt Rambo, wearing black/gray tie-dye uniforms) vs. Team Baptiste (captain Trevor Baptiste, wearing white/rainbow-colored tie-dye uniforms). All uniforms had name plates with the player's (@) Instagram profile names on the back of their jerseys.

Outcome
Winners: The score was 17–16, Team Baptiste over Team Rambo with a second half comeback, scoring 9 of the final 13 goals of the game. The All-Star game MVP award (presented by Mike Rabil) went to goalie Jack Concannon who had 13 saves with only 5 goals allowed in the second half. The attendance was 8,189.

Rosters

Team Baptiste Coaches:
 Head coach – Nat St. Laurent (Redwoods)
 Assistant coach – Andy Towers (Chaos)

Team Rambo Coaches:
 Head coach – Jim Stagnitta (Whipsnakes)
 Assistant coach – Chris Bates (Archers)

Skills Competition

The All-Star Skills Competition took place right after the All-Star game on NBC Sports Gold. The events featured were named: 
Fastest player – 5 of the fastest competitors run from the in line to the top of the opposite 2-point arc. The first 3 to cross the line move onto Round 2.
Participants: Brent Adams, Sergio Salcidd, Dan Eipp, Mark Glicini, Jarrod Neumann
Winner: Dan Eipp
Adidas Freestyle Challenge – players have 30 seconds each to score 1 goal in the most creative way possible. Judges score with a 1 to 10 rating.
Participants: Connor Fields, Ryder Garnsey, Scott Ratliff, Ryan Drenner, Justin Guterding
Winner: Justin Guterding
Goalie competition – 3 goalies will try and stop as many shots as possible in 30 seconds. The goalie who makes the most stops (save or a missed shot) wins the competition. 
Participants: Kyle Bernlohr, Tim Troutner, Blaze Ridrden
Winner: Tim Troutner
Vineyard Vines Accuracy Challenge – 6 competitors have 30 seconds to hit 5 targets in the cage as fast as they can from a distance of 10 yards.
Participants: Deemer Class, Ryan Brown, Will Manny, Tom Schreiber, Marcus Holman, Justin Guterding
Winner: Marcus Holman
Fastest shot – 2 rounds, 2 shots per player from 10 yards out to score with the fastest MPH shot on goal.
Participants: Jarrod Neumann, Connor Buczek, Blaze Riorden, Jake Froccaro, Myles Jones, Michael Ehrhardt
Winner: Jarrod Neumann

References

Premier Lacrosse League
Recurring sporting events established in 2019